Zhulebino may refer to:
Zhulebino District, now included in Vykhino-Zhulebino
Zhulebino (rural locality), a former village
Zhulebino (Moscow Metro)